The 2002 Prince Edward Island Scott Tournament of Hearts was held February 1–5  at the Silver Fox Curling Club in Summerside, Prince Edward Island. The winning team was Team Kathy O'Rourke who represented Prince Edward Island, finished with a 3-8 round-robin record at the 2002 Scott Tournament of Hearts in Brandon, Manitoba.

Teams

Draw 1
February 1, 10:00 AM AT

Draw 2
February 1, 3:00 PM  AT

Draw 3
February 2,  9:00 AM AT

Draw 4 
February 2, 2:00 PM  AT

A Side Final 
February 2, 7:00 PM AT

Draw 5 
February, AT

Draw 6
February 3, 2:00 PM AT

B Side Final
February 3, 7:00 PM AT

Draw 7
February 3, 7:00 PM AT

Draw 8 
February 4, 2:00 PM AT

C Side Final 
February 4, 7:00 PM AT

Playoffs

Semi-final
February 5, 11:00 AM AT

Final
February 5, 4:00 PM AT

References

Prince Edward Island Scott Tournament Of Hearts, 2002
2002 in Prince Edward Island
Curling competitions in Prince Edward Island
Sport in Summerside, Prince Edward Island